Getzlaf is a surname. Notable people with the surname include:

 Chris Getzlaf (born 1983), Canadian football player
 Ryan Getzlaf (born 1985), Canadian ice hockey player